The K-278 Komsomolets was the Project-685 Plavnik (Russian: проект-685 плавник, meaning "fin", also known by her NATO reporting name of "Mike"-class), nuclear-powered attack submarine of the Soviet Navy; the only submarine of her design class.

Although K-278 was commissioned in the Soviet Navy to evaluate the technology for the fourth-generation of Russian nuclear submarines, she was capable of combat maneuvering and deployment. During her third operational patrol in the Arctic Ocean in 1989, a serious fire in the aft compartments led to her sinking in the Barents Sea off the coast of Norway.

Despite the fire in the engineering compartment, K-278 was able to surface and remained afloat for approximately five hours before sinking. Many of the crew perished before rescue, leading to 42 total dead.

The wrecked submarine is on the floor of the Barents Sea, about 1.7 km (1 mile) deep, with her nuclear reactor and two nuclear warhead-armed torpedoes still on board.

Design
The Project 685 was designed by the Rubin Design Bureau in response to a challenge to develop an advanced submarine that could carry a mix of torpedoes and cruise missiles with conventional or nuclear warheads. The order to design the submarine was issued in 1966 and design was completed in 1974. The keel was laid down on 22 April 1978 at Severodvinsk. K-278 was launched on 3 June 1983 and commissioned on 28 December 1983.

K-278 had a double hull, the inner one being composed of titanium, which gave her an operating depth far greater than that of the best American submarines. The pressure hull was composed of seven compartments with the second and third protected by stronger forward and aft bulkheads creating a "safety zone" in case of an emergency. An escape capsule was fitted in the fin above these compartments to enable the crew to abandon ship in the event of an underwater emergency. Initial Western intelligence estimates of K-278'''s speed were based on the assumption that the boat was powered by a pair of liquid metal cooled reactors. When the Soviet Union revealed that the submarine used a single OK-650b-3 conventional pressurized-water reactor, these speed estimates were lowered.

Crew
According to Norman Polmar and Kenneth J. Moore, two Western experts on Soviet submarine design and operations, the Project 685's advanced design included many automated systems which allowed for fewer crew members than usual for a submarine of her size. The manning table approved by the Soviet Ministry of Defense in 1982 called for a crew of 57 men. This was later increased to 64: 30 officers, 22 warrant officers, and 12 petty officers and seamen. At the time of the boat's sinking, 69 were aboard.

Name

Sinking
The reactor scrammed and propulsion was lost. Electrical problems spread as cables burned through, and control of the boat was threatened. An emergency ballast tank blow was performed and the submarine surfaced eleven minutes after the fire began. Distress calls were made, and most of the crew abandoned ship.

The fire continued to burn, fed by the compressed air system. The commanding officer and four others who were still on board entered the escape capsule and ejected it. Only one of the five to reach the surface was able to leave the capsule and survive before it sank in the rough seas. Captain Vanin was among the dead.

Rescue aircraft arrived quickly and dropped small rafts, but winds and sea conditions precluded their use.  Many men had already died from hypothermia in the  water of the Barents Sea. The floating fish factory B-64/10 Aleksey Khlobystov (Алексей Хлобыстов) arrived 81 minutes after K-278 sank, and took aboard survivors.

Of the 69 crewmen, 27 survived the incident and 42 died: 9 during the accident and the subsequent sinking, 30 in the water of hypothermia or injuries, and three aboard the rescue boat. The crew were awarded the Order of the Red Banner after the incident.

Aftermath
As well as eight standard torpedoes, K-278 was carrying two torpedoes armed with nuclear warheads. Under pressure from Norway, the Soviet Union used deep sea submersibles operated from the oceanographic research ship Keldysh to search for K-278. In June 1989, two months after the sinking, the wreck was located. Soviet officials stated that any possible leaks were insignificant and posed no threat to the environment.

In 1993, Vice Admiral Chernov, commander of the submarine group of which the Komsomolets was part, founded the Komsomolets Nuclear Submarine Memorial Society, a charity to support the widows and orphans of his former command. Since then, the Society's charter has expanded to provide assistance to the families of all Soviet and Russian submariners lost at sea, and 7 April has become a day of commemoration for all submariners lost at sea.

An expedition in mid-1994 revealed some plutonium leakage from one of the two nuclear-armed torpedoes. On 24 June 1995, Keldysh set out again from Saint Petersburg to the Komsomolets to seal the hull fractures in Compartment 1 and cover the nuclear warheads, and declared success at the end of a subsequent expedition in July 1996. Furfurol, the jelly-like sealant, was projected to make the wreck radiation safe for 20 to 30 years, that is, until 2015 to 2025.

Norwegian authorities from the Marine Environmental Agency and Radiation Agency take water and ground samples from the vicinity of the wreck on a yearly basis.

In July 2019, a joint Norwegian-Russian expedition found "clouds" emitted from a ventilation pipe and a nearby grille. They took water samples from the pipe and from several metres above, and analysed them for caesium-137. That pipe had been identified as a leak in several Mir missions up to 1998 and 2007. The activity levels in the six samples out of the pipe were up to 800 Bq/L (9 July). No activity could be detected in the free-water samples. Due to dilution, there is no threat to the environment. The Norwegian limit on caesium-137 in food products is 600 Bq/kg. The background activity of caesium-137 in the water body is as low as 0.001 Bq/L. More sensitive measurements of the samples were reported to be in progress.

See also
 List of sunken nuclear submarines

Notes

References

Bibliography
 The Sunken Nuclear Submarine Komsomolets and its effects on the Environment (by Steinar Høibråten, Per E. Thoresen and Are Haugan. Published by Elsevier Science. 1997)
 Wallace, Wendy, "Komsomolets: A Disaster Waiting to Happen?", CIS Environmental Watch, Spring 1992.
 Montgomery, George, "The Komsomolets Disaster", Studies in Intelligence, Vol. 38, No. 5 (1995)
 Romanov, D. A., Fire at Sea: The Tragedy of the Soviet Submarine Komsomolets. Edited by K. J. Moore. Washington, DC: Potomac Books, Inc., 2006. (Note: Romanov was the Soviet submarine's deputy designer at the Rubin Design Bureau and he defends his agency's design against the Soviet Navy's initial claims that "numerous technical imperfections" caused the accident.)
 Gary Weir and Walter Boyne, Rising Tide: The untold story of the Russian submarines that fought the Cold War'', New York, NY: Basic Books,(2003)

External links
 Project 685 (Plavnik) – Mike Class
 GlobalSecurity article
 Federation of American Scientists 
 Энциклопедия кораблей
 Книга памяти – K-278
 Mizokami, Kyle, "Russia Has Destroyed..."

External links 

 TED Case Studies: Komsomolets Submarine and Radiation Leakage
 
 
 
 
 
 
 
 

Nuclear submarines of the Soviet Navy
Ships built in the Soviet Union
1983 ships
Maritime incidents in 1989
Shipwrecks in the Barents Sea
Lost submarines of the Soviet Union
Russian submarine accidents
Sunken nuclear submarines
Komsomolets, K-278 Soviet submarine
Norway–Soviet Union relations
Ships built by Sevmash